Amarpura is a village in Rajgarh tehsil of Churu district in Rajasthan.

Location 
It is situated in 24  km northeast direction of Rajgarh city. Its neighbouring villages are Ratanpura, Bhuwari, Chimanpura, Mundibadi, Baas Radsana,

Population 
As of the census of 2011, there are 1335 people out of them 682 are male and 653 are female.

References 

Villages in Churu district